Dendrobium radiatum, commonly known as the brushbox feather orchid, is a species of epiphytic orchid that is endemic to eastern Australia. It has cylindrical pseudobulbs, up to three leathery, dark green leaves and up to eleven white flowers with purplish markings on the labellum.

Description 
Flowering occurs between August and October.

Taxonomy and naming
The brushbox feather orchid was first formally described in 2006 by David Jones and Mark Clements from a plant collected near Nerang. It was given the name Tropilis radiata and the description was published in Australian Orchid Research. In 2014, Julian Shaw changed the name to Dendrobium radiatum. The specific epithet (radiatum) is a Latin word meaning "rayed", "beaming" or "shining", referring to the pseudobulbs which are arranged like the spokes of a wheel.

Distribution and habitat
Dendrobium radiatum grows exclusively on the scaly bark near the base of brush box (Lophostemon confertus) trees. It occurs between Eungella in Queensland and Wauchope in New South Wales.

References

radiatum
Endemic orchids of Australia
Orchids of New South Wales
Orchids of Queensland
Plants described in 2006